Lanthanum chloride is the inorganic compound with the formula LaCl3. It is a common salt of lanthanum which is mainly used in research. It is a white solid that is highly soluble in water and alcohols.

Preparation
Anhydrous lanthanum(III) chloride can be produced by the ammonium chloride route.  In the first step, lanthanum oxide is heated with ammonium chloride to produce the ammonium salt of the pentachloride:
La2O3  +  10NH4Cl  →   2(NH4)2LaCl5  +  6H2O  +  6NH3
In the second step, the ammonium chloride salt is converted to the trichlorides by heating in a vacuum at 350-400 ºC:
(NH4)2LaCl5 →   LaCl3  +  2HCl  +  2NH3

Uses
Lanthanum chloride is also used in biochemical research to block the activity of divalent cation channels, mainly calcium channels.  Doped with cerium, it is used as a scintillator material.

In organic synthesis, lanthanum trichloride functions as a mild Lewis acid for converting aldehydes to acetals.

The compound has been identified as a catalyst for the high pressure oxidative chlorination of methane to chloromethane with hydrochloric acid and oxygen.

Also used in the field of geology as a very dilute solution, which when combined with the proper acids can help identify small >1% Strontium content in powdered rock samples.

References

Chlorides
Lanthanum compounds
Lanthanide halides